The Enstrom 480 is a small, light helicopter produced by the Enstrom Helicopter Corporation.

Design and development
In the 1980s the Enstrom Helicopter Company was producing two helicopters, both powered by horizontally-opposed piston engines. When the United States Army revealed a requirement for a turbine-powered training helicopter, the company designed a larger, turbine-powered version of its 280 Shark. The proposed unit was designated TH28 (TH for "training helicopter" derived from the 28(0), since the Army's proposal was NTH, "new training helicopter").

The Army contract effort was not successful, but the company effort looked promising enough that management committed to continue with a commercial version, which was introduced in 1993. Its power was provided by the C20W variant of the Rolls-Royce Model 250 turboshaft engine.

Design
The 480 fuselage consists of a welded steel-tube framework with aluminum cover and tailcone. The pilot controls the aircraft from the left seat, which is unusual for helicopters. The aircraft does not have a hydraulic system; a trim system absorbs rotor feedback and allows the pilot to position the desired stick setting.
The 480B  engine is capable of producing 420 shp, but in this application it is derated to 305 shp for 5 minutes and 277 continuous shp, which is available to 13,000 MSL on a standard day. Thus hot-temperature or high-altitude operations have a considerable degree of power available. The engine drives a three-bladed rotor of 32 feet diameter and a tail rotor of 5 feet diameter. The main rotor and hubs weigh a total of 300 pounds, so there is considerable inertia in the system during a loss of power. Autorotation landings are uneventful.

Variants
480
Five-seat civil version based on the Enstrom TH-28, certified in November 1993.

480B
Enhanced and with increased gross weight (3000 lb) and power limits, certified in February 2001 in the US.  and in February 2019 in Canada. The gross weight and useful load were increased by approximately 150 pounds.
480B Guardian
480B configured for police or law enforcement operations, fitted with a front-mounted camera and searchlight.
TH-28
Based on the Enstrom 280FX with a turbine engine, a larger cabin and larger horizontal and vertical stabilizers. Certified in September 1992 Military training, light patrol version, six built.

Operators

Civil operators
The aircraft is operated by a large number of small commercial and flight training operators, most operating one or two aircraft.

Military and government operators

 CLV flight training

 Military of Equatorial Guinea 

 Indonesian National Police

 Japan Ground Self-Defense Force

 Royal Thai Army

 Venezuelan Air Force

Former operators
 
 York Regional Police

 Police and Border Guard Aviation Group

Specifications (480)

See also

References

Federal Aviation Authority Type Certificate No.H1CE

External links

 Enstrom 480B product page
 Enstrom page on The Helicopter History site
 Enstrom in Ukraine

Enstrom aircraft
1980s United States civil utility aircraft
1980s United States helicopters
Aircraft first flown in 1989